Platensina intacta is a species of tephritid or fruit flies in the genus Platensina of the family Tephritidae.

Distribution
Thailand, Cambodia, Vietnam.

References

Tephritinae
Insects described in 1973
Diptera of Asia